Douglas Everett was a Canadian automobile dealer, lawyer and retired Senator.

Douglas or Doug Everett may also refer to:

Douglas Everett (ice hockey) (1905–1996), American ice hockey player
Doug Everett, character in Adventure in Iraq
C. Douglas Everett (1902–1982), insurance agent and political figure in New Brunswick, Canada
Douglas Hugh Everett (1916–2002), British chemist